Question 2 is the name of various ballot measures in the United States:

Maine Question 2 (disambiguation):
2016 Maine Question 2, An Act to Establish The Fund to Advance Public Kindergarten to Grade 12 Education
2017 Maine Question 2, An Act To Enhance Access to Affordable Health Care

Massachusetts Question 2 (disambiguation):
1980 Massachusetts Proposition 2½, ballot measure
2002 Massachusetts Question 2, the Massachusetts English Language Education in Public Schools Initiative
Question 2, 2006 ballot
2008 Massachusetts Question 2, the Massachusetts Sensible Marijuana Policy Initiative
2010 Massachusetts Question 2, the Massachusetts Comprehensive Permits and Regional Planning Initiative
2012 Massachusetts Question 2, the Massachusetts Death with Dignity Initiative
2014 Massachusetts Question 2, the Massachusetts Expansion of Bottle Deposits Initiative
2016 Massachusetts Question 2, the Massachusetts Charter School Expansion Initiative
Advisory Commission for Amendments to the U.S. Constitution, 2018 ballot
2020 Massachusetts Question 2, the Massachusetts Ranked-Choice Voting Initiative

Minnesota:
2021 Minneapolis Question 2, the failed voter initiative to replace the police department with a public safety department
Nevada Question 2 (disambiguation):
2002 Nevada Question 2, a voter initiative to prohibit same-sex marriage in Nevada
Nevada Question 2 (2016), a voter initiative to legalize cannabis
2020 Nevada Question 2, a voter initiative to allow same-sex marriage in Nevada